The Finding of Moses refers to several paintings of the Finding of Moses by Paolo Veronese and his studio.  These include:

 The Finding of Moses (Veronese, Dijon)
 The Finding of Moses (Veronese, Dresden)
 The Finding of Moses (studio of Veronese, Liverpool)
 The Finding of Moses (Veronese, Lyon)
 The Finding of Moses (Veronese, Madrid)
 The Finding of Moses (Veronese, Smith collection)
 The Finding of Moses (studio of Veronese, Turin)
 The Finding of Moses (Washington)

Finding of Moses
Veronese